Alfred 'Fredy' Heiß (born 5 December 1940 in Munich) is a retired German football player. He spent seven seasons in the Bundesliga with TSV 1860 München. He also represented Germany eight times, including a 1966 FIFA World Cup qualifier against Cyprus (he scored a goal in that game) and seven friendlies.

Honours
 UEFA Cup Winners' Cup finalist: 1964–65
 Bundesliga champion: 1965–66
 Bundesliga runner-up: 1966–67
 DFB-Pokal winner: 1963–64

External links
 

1940 births
Living people
German footballers
Germany international footballers
Bundesliga players
TSV 1860 Munich players
Footballers from Munich
Association football forwards
West German footballers